This is a timeline of major events in the history of the modern state of Jordan.

Partitioning of the Ottoman Empire period
 
1916: In May, in advance of the Triple Entente's defeat of the Ottoman Empire, the Sykes–Picot Agreement carves it up between Britain and France, defining much of the common border between Syria and what was to become Jordan, Palestine / Israel and Iraq. At the time, the area which is today Jordan was part of the Hejaz Vilayet and the Syria Vilayet
1916: In June, Hussein bin Ali, Sharif of Mecca entered into an alliance with the United Kingdom and France against the Ottomans sometime around 8 June 1916, the actual date being somewhat uncertain. This alliance began the Arab Revolt.
1916: In June, Hussein bin Ali, Sharif of Mecca is declared King of the Kingdom of Hejaz
1917: Auda ibu Tayi and T. E. Lawrence defeat the Ottomans at the Battle of Aqaba – the primary military success of the Hashemite forces in the Arab Revolt
1918: Ottomans repel the First Transjordan attack on Amman and Second Transjordan attack on Shunet Nimrin and Es Salt
1918: Between September and October, Triple Entente forces defeat the Ottomans in Megiddo, Damascus, Amman and Deraa
1918: The Ottoman Empire signed the Armistice of Mudros, ending the Middle Eastern theatre of World War I
1918: Faisal, the leader of the Arab revolt and the third son of Hussein, King of Hejaz, is declared head of a provisional government in what was previously the Vilayet of Syria The area which became Trans-Jordan was split between the southern extension of Syria and the northern extension of Hejaz
1920: In March, Faisal proclaimed himself King of the Kingdom of Syria

Mandate for Palestine
1920: In April, the San Remo conference formally outlines the proposed French Mandate for Syria and the Lebanon and British Mandate for Palestine along the lines of the Sykes–Picot Agreement. The border between British and French territory would carve northern Trans-Jordan from the Vilayet of Syria, however no direct mention of Trans-Jordan was made at the conference
1920: Battle of Maysalun – In July, French forces captured Damascus and expelled Faisal. His brother Abdullah moved his forces into Ma'an (then in the north of the Kingdom of Hejaz) with a view to liberating Damascus, where his brother had been proclaimed King in 1918.
1920: In August, Herbert Samuel delivers his speech at Salt, for which he was reprimanded by Curzon
1920: In October, Frederick Peake formed a unit of 150 men called the "Mobile Force"

Emirate and Mandate period
Emirate of Trans-Jordan | Mandate for Palestine
 1921: In March, the Cairo Conference (1921) agrees to award the Emirate of Trans-Jordan to Abdullah and the mandate of Mesopotamia to Faisal During the conference, Winston Churchill convinced Abdullah to stay put and not attack the French because that would threaten his throne in Transjordan since the French had military superiority over his forces.
 1922: The Council of the League of Nations accepts the British Transjordan memorandum defining the limits of Trans-Jordan and excluding that territory from the provisions in the Mandate concerning the Jewish national home.

Emirate of Trans-Jordan | Trans-Jordan memorandum
 1922: British Government passes the Order defining Boundaries of Territory to which the Palestine Order-in-Council does not applyl see Trans-Jordan memorandum
 1923: Britain recognises Transjordan with Abdullah as its leader
 1923: Frederick Peake's "Mobile Force" becomes Al Jeish al Arabi (the Arab Army), known in English as the Arab Legion
 1925: Hadda Agreement between TransJordan and Nejd formally agrees the boundary between the two countries following the Kuwait Conference. The agreement concludes by stating "This Agreement will remain in force for so long as His Britannic Majesty's Government are entrusted with the Mandate for Trans-Jordan"

Post-Mandate period
Hashemite Kingdom of Transjordan
 1946: Britain ends its mandate over Transjordan, granting full independence to the Kingdom
 1947: Dead Sea Scrolls discovered
 1947–48: Thousands of Palestinians flee Arab–Israeli fighting to West Bank and Jordan
 1948–49: 1948 Arab–Israeli War concludes with the armistice agreements. The territory of the Mandatory Palestine is divided between Israel, Jordan (changed from Transjordan) and Egypt
Hashemite Kingdom of Jordan

Post 1948 war

 1951: Riad as-Solh, former Lebanese prime minister, was assassinated in Amman by member of the Syrian Nationalist Party.
 1951:  King Abdullah I of Jordan was assassinated in Jerusalem by a Palestinian after rumors circulating about his intent to sign a peace treaty with Israel. Talal is proclaimed king after his father.
 1952: Constitution of Jordan established. Talal abdicates the throne due to illness. 
 1955: Wide scale violent anti-Hashemite riots across Jordan result in resignation of the Majali government and retraction of Jordan from the Baghdad Pact. An anti-Christian riot also takes place in Madaba the same year.
 1956: King Hussein sacks the British personnel in the Jordanian army, an act of Arabization to ensure the complete soveireginty of Jordan.
 1957: 1957 alleged Jordanian military coup attempt.
 1958: Arab Federation of Iraq and Jordan created in February, shortly before the creation of United Arab Republic between Egypt and Syria. It was disestablished following the 14 July Revolution in Iraq.
 1965: Jordan and Saudi Arabia concluded a bilateral agreement that realigned and delimited the boundary, resulting in some exchange of territory, allowing Jordan to expand its port facilities at Aqaba and protecting the pasturage and watering rights of certain nomadic tribes.
 1967: Six-Day War

Post 1967 war
 1968: Battle of Karameh between the Israel Defense Forces (IDF) and combined forces of the Palestine Liberation Organization (PLO) and the Jordanian Army.
 1970: Black September in Jordan. The PLO were driven out to Lebanon.
 1973: Yom Kippur War
 1994: Israel–Jordan Treaty of Peace
 1999: King Abdullah bin Al Hussein became the 4th king of The Hashemite Kingdom of Jordan.
 2005: 2005 Amman bombings by Al-Qaeda leader Abu Musab Al-Zarqawi.
 2010: 2011–12 Jordanian protests breaks out as part of the Arab Spring demanding economic and political reforms.
 2014: Jordanian intervention in the Syrian Civil War began on 22 September 2014, with air strikes on Islamic State of Iraq and the Levant (ISIL) targets, and escalated after the murder on Muath al-Kasasbeh, a captured Jordanian pilot, by ISIL, in early 2015.

See also
History of Jordan
 Timeline of Amman

References
Harding, G. Lankester. 1959. The Antiquities of Jordan. Lutterworth Press, London. 2nd impression, 1960.

External links
 Jordan History Discussion Forum 

Jordanian timelines
Modern history of Jordan
Years in Jordan